Hess Tower is a 29-story building located adjacent to Discovery Green park in downtown Houston, Texas. It was formerly called Discovery Tower until Hess Corporation leased the entire tower in January 2009.

The global architectural firm Gensler designed the building. The building was a project of Trammell Crow Company, a real estate development and investment firm.

The building was originally designed to house a number of wind turbines, but the turbines were removed in December 2010.

References

External links

Skyscraper office buildings in Houston
Office buildings completed in 2010
Buildings and structures in Houston